The Extraordinary and Plenipotentiary Ambassador of Peru to the Oriental Republic of Uruguay is the official representative of the Republic of Peru to the Oriental Republic of Uruguay. The Ambassador also acts as the representative of Peru to ALADI and Mercosur.

Both countries established relations in 1849, when Peru sent Consul José María Civils to Montevideo. Both countries have developed stable relations, although it was only in 1922 that the first legal instrument between both nations was successfully signed.

List of representatives

References

Uruguay
Peru